The Malta national women's cricket team is the team that represents Malta in international women's cricket. In April 2018, the International Cricket Council (ICC) granted full Women's Twenty20 International (WT20I) status to all its members. Therefore, all Twenty20 matches to be played between Malta women and other ICC members after 1 July 2018 have been eligible for full WT20I status.

Records and statistics 
International Match Summary — Malta Women
 
Last updated 28 August 2022

Twenty20 International 
T20I record versus other nations

Records complete to WT20I #1201. Last updated 28 August 2022.

See also
 List of Malta women Twenty20 International cricketers

References

Further reading

 

Women
C
Women's national cricket teams